The Samsung SGH-P520 is a mobile phone created by Samsung Electronics, announced on September 24, 2007, at a Giorgio Armani fashion show in Milan in a partnership between the two companies.

It is the successor to the Samsung P310 (and the P300 before that), classified by Samsung as a "credit card-phone". Originally retailing at 750 euros ($1100), it has a 2.6-inch touchscreen with haptic feedback similar to that of the LG Viewty and a 3-megapixel camera. It uses Samsung's "Croix" user interface.

The Samsung Giorgio Armani's design would heavily influence the Samsung Tocco handset in 2008.

Reception
Mobile-review.com praised the screen quality as being among the best, but the reviewer found texting on it "fiddly". TechRadar liked the slim and stylish design along with the haptic display, but criticised the user interface and lack of 3G or Wi-Fi. Softpedia called it a 'copycat' of LG's Prada handset.

See also
LG Prada
Samsung G800
Samsung M7500 Emporio Armani
Samsung Ultra Smart F700
Samsung F480 Tocco

References 

P520
Mobile phones introduced in 2007